In software testing, error guessing is a test method in which test cases used to find bugs in programs are established based on experience in prior testing. The scope of test cases usually rely on the software tester involved, who uses experience and intuition to determine what situations commonly cause software failure, or may cause errors to appear. Typical errors include divide by zero, null pointers, or invalid parameters.

Error guessing has no explicit rules for testing; test cases can be designed depending on the situation, either drawing from functional documents or when an unexpected/undocumented error is found while testing operations.

References 

Software testing
Computer programming

kk:Бағдарламалық тестілеу